Antun Lokošek (2 January 1920—24 December 1994) was a Croatian footballer who played for several clubs in Yugoslavia.

Playing career

Club
Born in Celje, he played with Slavija Osijek and NK Slavija before joining Građanski Zagreb in 1943.  He was first registered for Slavija Osijek at March 1937. At the end of World War II he moved to Hajduk Split.  In 1947 he played the Yugoslav Cup final with FK Naša Krila Zemun. Later between 1948 and 1950 he played with NK Lokomotiva. After retiring, he became a coach, and coached NK Orkan and NK Jugovinil.  He died in Split in 1994.

In 1946 he joined HNK Hajduk Split Later, he played with NK Lokomotiva and HNK Rijeka, known as Kvarner back then, where he finished his career in 1953.

International
In 1944, he played for the short lived (1939–1944) national team of the Independent State of Croatia, a World War II-era puppet state of Nazi Germany, recording his single cap, and also scoring, in a 7–3 victory against Slovakia.

Managerial career
He graduated in the coaching academy in Zagreb, and became coach of Kvarner in season 1953–54, immediately after retiring from his playing career. Then he moved to Split and coached NK Orkan Dugi Rat and Jugovinil Kaštel Gomilica.

References

External links
 

1919 births
1994 deaths
Sportspeople from Celje
Association football midfielders
Yugoslav footballers
Croatian footballers
Croatia international footballers
NK Varaždin players
HŠK Građanski Zagreb players
HNK Hajduk Split players
FK Naša Krila Zemun players
NK Lokomotiva Zagreb players
HNK Rijeka players
Yugoslav First League players
Yugoslav football managers
HNK Rijeka managers